Nawaminthrachinuthit Bodindecha School is a public school in downtown Bangkok, Thailand. The school admits students grades 7 to 12.

Nawaminthrachinuthit Bodindecha School is one of nine schools founded to honour Her Majesty the Queen on her sixtieth anniversary. The school is  the third of the Bodindecha school group.

About the school

History 
Nawaminthrachinuthit Bodindecha Schoolis one of the nine schools founded to honour Her Majesty the Queen on her sixtieth birthday. It was founded on July 31, 1992. At the beginning, the school was managed by Khunying Lakkana Saengsanit, the then director of Bodindecha (Sing Singhaseni) School). Nawaminthrachinuthit means devotion to the queen of the 9th King. Bodindecha is taken from the name of Army General Chao Phraya Bodindecha, who is also known as Singh(), or simply Sing,  from his family name of Singhaseni. During the reign of Chakri dynasty King Rama III ( 1824–1851), General Singh led an army from Bangkok to put down the rebellion of Lord Anouvong  of Vientiane (1826–1828). 

The school received the 'Outstanding Secondary School Award' from the Department of General Education in 1996.

The school is an ISO 9002 standard organization and received its certificate in 1999.

The school 
 Tree (flora):    Nine Gullapraphruks (9 Wishing Trees) 
 Area: 6 Acres (15 ไร่)
 Number of classes: 62
 Number of students: 2000+

English Program (EP)
The program equips the students with literacy and numeracy through the study of English, Science, Information and Communication Technology (ICT), Health Science and Phvsical Education(PE).

School facilities
Audio 
Visual 
Computer and LAN system 
Video 
Science labs 
Books 
Printing 
Photocopying 
Cd’s 
Library 
Computer room (120 computers for students study) 
Internet Room (25 computers for students use) 
E-learning center (60 computers) 
Overhead projector and ceiling electric fan in every classroom 
Learning center with LCD projector in every department 
Canteen 
Assembly Hall 
Mini theater and music room 
Herbs and botanical garden 
Sports fields for soccer, basketball, volleyball, badminton and table tennis

Directors 
Mr. Amornrat Pin-ngern, first director, 1992 - 1998
Mr. Palongyoot Indhapan, second director, 1998 - 2002
Mrs. Pornpat Sitthiwong, third director, 2002 - 2005
Mr. Jamlong Chey-Aksorn, fourth director, 2006 - 2008
Mr. Chonan Maroottawong, fifth director, 2008 - 2011
Dr. Salinee Meecharoen, sixth director, 2011-2013
Mrs. Pornpimol Pornchanarak, seventh director, 2013 - 2015
Mrs. Suchada Phuttanimon, eight director, 2015 - 2017
Mr. Manus Pinnikorn, ninth director, 2017 - 2020
Mr. Surasit Charoenwai, tenth director, 2020–Present

External links 
 School website

Schools in Bangkok
Educational institutions established in 1992
1992 establishments in Thailand